Mangelia digressa is a species of sea snail, a marine gastropod mollusk in the family Mangeliidae.

Description

Distribution
This marine species occurs off Angola.

References

 Rolan, E. & Otero-Schmitt, J. 1999. Argonauta. 13(1): 5–26, figs.57–62,97-98.

External links
  Tucker, J.K. 2004 Catalog of recent and fossil turrids (Mollusca: Gastropoda). Zootaxa 682:1–1295.
 MHN Catálogo do Museo de Historia Natural: Mangelia digressa

Endemic fauna of Angola
digressa
Gastropods described in 1999